John Ross Frederick Duncan (born 25 March 1944) is a former Australian cricketer who played one Test in 1971.

A right-arm fast-medium bowler, Duncan was brought into the Test team for the Fifth Test at Melbourne which replaced the Victoria second tour match against the MCC in the 1970–71 Ashes series. Brought in as a fast-medium seam bowler to replace the injured Graham McKenzie, Duncan made only 3 with the bat and took 0/30 with the ball in the first innings, but did not bat or bowl in the second and took no catches. He was dropped for the Sixth Test in favour of Dennis Lillee. He also represented Australia in 1971–72 in one match against Gary Sobers' Rest of the World XI, again without success.

He played for Queensland from 1964–65 to 1970–71, usually opening the bowling with Peter Allan, then for Victoria in 1971–72 and 1972–73. His best performance was 8 for 55 and 5 for 70 against Victoria at Melbourne in December 1970.

See also
 List of Victoria first-class cricketers

References

External links
 Ross Duncan at Cricket Archive
 Ross Duncan at Cricinfo

1944 births
Living people
Australia Test cricketers
Queensland cricketers
Victoria cricketers
Cricketers from Brisbane
Australian cricketers